The flag of Akershus represents Akershus county, Norway. Designed by Finn Fagerli, it was approved by Royal Resolution on 11 December 1987. The flag is a banner of the Coat of arms of Akershus which is a silver step-gable on a blue field. It is rare among Norwegian flags in being square. The design is a reference to Akershus Castle where several of the buildings feature such gables. The castle was the seat of the governor of Akershus Amt, the predecessor of today's county.

References
Official web page by Akershus county
Store Norske Leksikon on Akershus 

Flags of Norway
Akershus